CA Immo or CA Immobilien Anlagen is an Austrian real estate company based in Vienna with offices in Germany (Berlin, Frankfurt and Munich), and the respective capitals of Poland, Hungary, the Czech Republic and Romania. CA Immo's core competence is the development and management of office properties in core Europe. In addition to managing existing properties, CA Immo in Germany focuses on the development and realisation of new properties, including entire city districts. As of March 2011, it is a member of the Austrian Traded Index (ATX), the index of the twenty largest companies traded on the Vienna Stock Exchange.

It is involved with a number of large and notable buildings, including Tower 185, the Skyline Plaza complex in Frankfurt and the Europacity complex in Berlin.

Management 

Silvia Schmitten-Walgenbach was appointed CEO of CA Immobilien Anlagen AG as of 1 January 2022. Since 1 November 2018, Keegan Viscius has been part of the Management Board as the new Chief Investment Officer . Andreas Schillhofer assumed the function of Chief Financial Officer as of June 2019.

History 

CA Immo was founded in 1987 as part of Creditanstalt-Bankverein, an Austrian commercial bank and has been listed on the Vienna Stock Exchange [HC1] since 1988; since April 2007, CA Immo shares have been traded on the Prime Market.

With a stake of around 57% of the share capital, SOF-11 Klimt CAI S.à. r.l., Luxembourg, a company managed by Starwood Capital Group, is the Company's largest shareholder. The remaining approximately 43% of the shares are in free float (as of November 2021).

In 2008, CA Immo acquired the German Vivico Real Estate GmbH, a subsidiary of Deutsche Bahn, including all non-operational land and brownfield sites of Deutsche Bahn as well as the branches in Munich, Berlin and Frankfurt, as part of its expansion plans in Germany. Since 2008, CA Immo has been one of the most active office developers in Germany

At the beginning of 2011, CA Immo acquired the property subsidiary of the Österreichischen Volksbanken Gruppe (ÖVAG) and thereby significantly expanded its portfolio in Eastern Europe. 

The company employs around 550 people in Austria, Germany and Eastern Europe (as of November 2021).

A longstanding goal of CA Immo was to merge with or take over its fellow ATX member Immofinanz. Merger negotiations failed in 2014, as did a takeover bid by CA Immo in spring 2015. In August 2016, CA Immo's then core shareholder O1 Group, controlled by Russian real estate billionaire Boris Mints and his son Dmitry Mints, sold its 26% stake in CA Immo to Austrian real estate investor Immofinanz, whose goal was also to merge the two companies. After this plan failed, Immofinanz sold its stake in CA Immo to Starwood Group at the end of September 2018.

References

External links
 Corporate website (in English)
 Corporate website (in German)
 German corporate website (in English)
 Budapest Business Journal interview
Vienna Stock Exchange: Market Data CA Immobilien Anlagen AG

Companies based in Vienna
Real estate companies of Austria
Real estate companies established in 1987